dublab is a non-profit music public broadcasting internet radio station based in Los Angeles. They have also been involved with art exhibition, film projects, event production, and record releases. These Shows are archived and downloadable on the dublab website. dublab also broadcasts on KLDB-LP on 99.1 FM in Los Angeles.

Their name is a portmanteau of dubbing and laboratory for the combined meaning: a place of experimenting with sampling music. Examples of this, besides their stream, is their film production Secondhand Sureshots where they gave producers, such as Daedelus, five dollars to buy albums from thrift stores and sampling the music to create new tracks. Another in audio/visual form is Into Infinity a collaboration with Creative Commons. It is a group art exhibition of around a hundred vinyl record sized circular artworks and more than a hundred eight second audio loops. The works are randomly dubbed together and is all made freely available for others to remix and sample, even on the project's website.

In January 2008, dublab formed a non-profit umbrella corporation Future Roots, Inc. The name comes from their characteristic style of mixing traditional music, such as folk, with electronic sounds. It also refers to the paradox that often music that is actually really old can sound very much like it was made in the present. In that theme, dublab will often only be written as either all lowercase or all uppercase by those familiar with the collective. There are other such characteristic writing styles such as a heavy use of alliteration.

Much of dublab's funding comes directly via listener support, with other funds generated through grants, Underwriting spots and event production. Their sound system and DJs have been featured at; MOCA, LACMA, Art Center College of Design, Barnsdall Art Park, CalArts, Page Museum/La Brea Tar Pits, The Getty Center, Disney Hall, UCLA, Hammer Museum, Hollywood Bowl, and El Rey Theatre.

They also have extended to releasing records such as; In The Loop series, Summer, Freeways, Echo Expansion and Light from Los Angeles. They record many Sprout Sessions at their studio in Los Angeles, which are released via their Live at dublab Podcast. These have made their way to record releases such as the Feathers Sprout Session. In August 2008 they released their performance video project called Vision Version, which is available as an RSS feed. They also have music-themed group art shows such as Into Infinity, Dream Scene, Up Our Sleeve, and Patchwork.

dublab was founded in 1999 by Jonathan Buck, Mark McNeill and fellow students from KSCR Radio at the University of Southern California.

Resident DJs 

Ale (Languis/Pharaohs)
Andres Renteria (Poo-bah)
Anenon (Non Projects)
Anthony Valadez (Record Breakin/KCRW)
Beatie Wolfe
Carlos Niño (Ammoncontact/Life Force Trio)
Cooper Saver
 Daedelus
Danny Holloway (Ximeno Records/Blazing 45s)
Derelict
EDJ
Farmer Dave Scher (All Night Radio/Beachwood Sparks)
Friends of Friends
Frosty (Adventure Time/Golden Hits)
Ganas (Mas Exitos)
Greg Belson (Divine Chord Gospel Show/45's of Fury)
Hashim B (Disques Corde)
Heidi Lawden
Hoseh (Headspace KXLU)
Induce (Induce's Listening)
Jake Jenkins
 Jeff Weiss [POW Radio]
Jen Ferrer
Jimmy Tamborello (Dntel)
Katie Byron (Golden Hits)
Kutmah (Poo-Bah)
Lovefingers (ESP Institute)
Low Limit (Icee Hot)
 Lucky Dragons
Mahssa (Finders Keepers)
Mamabear (Sweaterfunk)
Marco Paul
Maria Minerva
Marion Hodges (Hungry Beat/KCRW)
Matthewdavid (Leaving Records/Brainfeeder)
Michael Stock (Part Time Punks)
Morpho (The Masses)
Nanny Cantaloupe (Golden Hits/KXLU)
Nobody (Blank Blue/Low End Theory)
Ras G (Poo-Bah)
Rani de Leon (Soul in the Park, Radio Afrique)
Slow Motion DJs
Sodapop (Anticon)
Suzanne Kraft (Discothèque Records)
Take (Innercurrent)
Teebs (My Hollow Drum)
T-Kay (KSPC)
Tommy DeNys (Kraak)
Turquoise Wisdom (Biggest Crush)

Notable guests, artists, and DJs 

 Daedelus
 Flying Lotus
 Holy Fuck
 Mia Doi Todd
 Danny Holloway
 Lucky Dragons
 Dntel
 DJ Z-Trip
 Smaze
 Kozyndan
 Andy Votel
 Figurine
 Why?
 Stevie Jackson
 Animal Collective
 Ariel Pink
 Baby Dee
 Busdriver
 Cluster
 Cut Chemist
 Dan Deacon
 Robert Woodrow Wilson
 Allee Willis
 J Rocc
 Keith Fullerton Whitman
 Kyp Malone (TV on the Radio)
 Nobukazu Takemura
 Smegma
 Tom Brosseau
 Terry Callier
 Thomas Fehlmann
 Devendra Banhart
 Morton Subotnick
 Marshall Allen
 Damo Suzuki
 Matmos
 Four Tet
 Mouse On Mars
 Dungen
 Saul Williams
 Peter Hammarstedt
 Erlend Øye
 The One AM Radio
 Lavender Diamond
 Manuel Göttsching
 Trickfinger (John Frusciante)
 V. Vale
 Dustin Wong

References

External links 
 Dublab official site
 audio stream
 Into Infinity online exhibition
 Up Our Sleeve - Covers Art Project
 Turning On Tomorrow: Dublab's Proton Drive Fundraiser
 DUBLAB'S SECONDHAND SURESHOTS: DVD, 12-INCH, SLIPMATS & HAND-SCREENED SLEEVES
 core programs: futureroots.org

Internet radio stations in the United States
American music websites